The Estadio El Sardinero was a multi-use stadium in Santander, Spain. It was initially used as the stadium of Racing de Santander matches. It was replaced by the current Estadio El Sardinero in 1988. The capacity of the stadium was 20,000 spectators. In 1928, the stadium hosted the infamous Copa del Rey final between Barcelona and Real Sociedad, which needed 3 matches to decide the winners as the first two ended in 1–1 draws. Barcelona won 3–1 in the third match and the entire competition.

References

External links
Stadium history
Estadios de Espana

Racing de Santander
Sardinero
Buildings and structures in Cantabria
Sports venues completed in 1913
Sports venues demolished in 2008